Bangalaia is a genus of longhorn beetles of the subfamily Lamiinae, containing the following species:

 Bangalaia albata (Thomson, 1868)
 Bangalaia alboguttata Breuning, 1936
 Bangalaia angolensis Breuning, 1938
 Bangalaia babaulti (Villiers, 1942)
 Bangalaia bipunctipennis Breuning, 1966
 Bangalaia camerunica Breuning, 1974
 Bangalaia chaerila Jordan, 1903
 Bangalaia duffyi Breuning, 1962
 Bangalaia fisheri Breuning, 1936
 Bangalaia fulvosignata (Quedenfeldt, 1882)
 Bangalaia lislei Villiers, 1941
 Bangalaia margaretae Gilmour, 1956
 Bangalaia maublanci (Villiers, 1938)
 Bangalaia molitor Jordan, 1903
 Bangalaia nebulosa (Quedenfeldt, 1887)
 Bangalaia ocellata (Lameere, 1893)
 Bangalaia ochreomarmorata Breuning, 1958
 Bangalaia soror Jordan, 1903
 Bangalaia stiriaca Duvivier, 1890
 Bangalaia sulcicollis (Kolbe, 1893)
 Bangalaia thomensis Breuning, 1947
 Bangalaia vittata Jordan, 1903
 Bangalaia wissmanni (Quedenfeldt, 1888)

References

Prosopocerini